Mallappuzhassery is a village situated in Kozhencherry taluk of  Pathanamthitta district in Kerala, India. Its border starts in the middle of the temple grounds running north–south: the eastern part is Mallappuzhassery and the western part is Edasserimala. Edasserimala is part of Aranmula Panchayath and Mallappuzhassery is of Mallappuzhassery Panchayath. The northern border of this village is the Pamba River.

Mallapuzhassery village extends from the starting point of Aranmula Vallam Kali to its finishing point. The village has a school, four temples and a public library. It also has a palliyodam, Mallappuzhassery palliyodam, which won the snake boat race twice. Mrs Elizabeth Ninan from Chakkiteyil is the Panchayat President of Mallappuzhassery Panchayat

Demographics
At the 2001 India census, Mallapuzhassery had a population of 12,416 with 5,904 males and 6,512 females.

References

See also
 Aranmula kottaram
 Pathanamthitta

Villages in Pathanamthitta district